Shea Moylan (born 5 June 1987) is an Australian former professional rugby league footballer, previously playing for the Brisbane Broncos of the NRL. After playing in the Queensland Cup for the Wynnum Manly Seagulls, he made his debut in Round Fourteen of the 2011 NRL season against the Canberra Raiders. Moylan retired at the end of the 2013 season.

References

External links
Brisbane Broncos profile
Wynnum Manly Seagulls profile

1991 births
Living people
Australian rugby league players
Brisbane Broncos players
Indigenous Australian rugby league players
Rugby league centres
Rugby league players from Brisbane
Rugby league wingers
Wynnum Manly Seagulls players